This is a list of newspapers that have reprinted the Jyllands-Posten Muhammad cartoons or printed new cartoons depicting Muhammad in response to the controversy. This list is probably not complete.

Ordered chronologically

Newspapers closed, editors fired or arrested
Several editors were fired or/and arrested for their decision, or their intention, to re-publish the cartoons. Several newspapers were closed and at least one apologized.

Algeria
On February 12, 2006, Algeria closed two newspapers and arrested their editors for printing the images of Muhammad. Kahel Bousaad and Berkane Bouderbala, the respective editors of pro-Islamist weeklies Errisala and Iqraa, were detained and would appear before an investigating judge in Algiers, staff of the two Arabic newspapers said.

Belarus
Alexander Sdvizhkov, editor of the Zgoda opposition newspaper was sentenced to three years in prison for incitement of religious and national hatred on January 18, 2008. The newspaper was shut down in March 2006 for publishing the cartoons, and remains shut to date.

Canada
The University of Prince Edward Island's student newspaper The Cadre was removed from circulation by university authorities after reprinting some of the cartoons. The issue was subsequently pulled and destroyed by the UPEI Student Union, who publishes the student paper.

The now defunct Western Standard was the only notable English-language Canadian publication to print the cartoons.  Publisher Ezra Levant was investigated by the Albertan Human Rights Commission for 900 days before being acquitted.  Levant was the only person in the Western world charged for reprinting the cartoons, and under the HRC's operating rules was also responsible for his own legal fees which amounted to over $100,000.

Denmark
Politiken, a Danish newspaper which reprinted a single cartoon by Kurt Westergaard, has apologized for "offending Muslims", saying, "We apologize to anyone who was offended by our decision to reprint the cartoon drawing." The apology came as the result of a settlement reached between the newspaper and a group of eight Muslim groups from the Middle East and Australia.

Finland
Helsingin Sanomat reports: "The immediate feeling one gets is that this has all the makings of a good drama: an Oulu cultural magazine called Kaltio publishes a topical strip-cartoon, the magazine's editor get fired for it, and the illustrator loses a commission from the city."

France
Jacques Lefranc, managing director of France Soir, was fired after reprinting and prominently publishing an in-house cartoon about the controversy.

Jordan
Three of the cartoons were reprinted in the Jordanian weekly newspaper al-Shihan. The editor, Jihad Momani, was fired, and the publisher withdrew the newspaper from circulation. Jihad Momani issued a public apology, and was arrested and charged with insulting religion. Several of the cartoons were reprinted in the Jordanian newspaper al-Mehwar. Both men were sentenced to two months in prison on 30 May 2006.

Malaysia
Lester Melanyi, an editor of the Sarawak Tribune resigned from his post for allowing the reprinting of a cartoon. In East Malaysia non-Muslims are a majority in the otherwise predominantly Muslim state. The chief editor was summoned to the Internal Security Ministry. The Malaysian government has also shut down the newspaper indefinitely. Malaysia's third-largest Chinese-language daily, Guang Ming, was suspended from publication of its evening edition for carrying one of the cartoons in its February 3 edition. The suspension ran for two weeks from February 16 to March 1, 2006. The TV3 television station which aired some of the cartoons, however, has not been suspended.

Russia
The Russian weekly newspaper Nash Region was closed by its owner, Mikhail Smirnov: "I shut it down so that it wouldn't become a real cause of religious strife". Nash Region published a collage of the cartoons on 15 February 2006 as part of an article examining the cartoon controversy. It was the first time the cartoons had appeared in a Russian paper and prosecutors immediately opened an investigation into the editor, Anna Smirnova, on charges that she had used her position to incite hatred.
The mayor of the southern Russian city of Volgograd ordered the closure of the city-owned newspaper Gorodskiye Vesti after it published a cartoon depicting Muhammad on February 21, 2006.

Saudi Arabia
The Shams (Sun) was suspended as part of an investigation into its decision to publish the cartoons that have caused anger across the Muslim world.

South Africa
Courts in South Africa preemptively forbade any publication of cartoons containing Mohammed.

United Kingdom
The Cardiff University student newspaper gair rhydd (which is Welsh for free word) became the first organisation in the United Kingdom to publish the images. The day after publication, the decision was taken to pulp the edition and only approximately 200 copies were actually distributed. The editor along with two journalists were suspended for the decision to publish. Gair rhydd resumed publication on 13 February 2006, with an apology. Meurig Llwyd Williams, Archdeacon of Bangor, included a drawing, reprinted from the French newspaper Le Soir, in the church paper Y Llan. It showed Muhammad sitting on a heavenly cloud with God and Buddha and being told: "Don't complain - we've all been caricatured here." He was forced to resign and the issue of the paper was destroyed.

United States
Staff of the New York Press walked out in protest after management disallowed them to reproduce the cartoons as part of their reporting. Two editors of the University of Illinois' student paper, the Daily Illini, were suspended (one later fired) after reprinting the cartoons.
Days after the Illini printing, Northern Illinois University's campus newspaper The Northern Star also printed the cartoons, this time with the permission of their faculty adviser, and the consensus of the editors. The paper received letters on both sides of the issue for months.
The Harvard Salient, a conservative student biweekly at Harvard College, also printed the cartoons and were subject to a town hall forum by the Harvard College Interfaith Council.

Yemen
Yemen detained three journalists on February 12, 2006 (detaining a fourth shortly afterwards), and closed three publications that reprinted the cartoons: Al-Hurriya, Yemen Observer and al-Rai al-Aam. Those detained were Mohammed Al-Asadi, editor-in-chief of the English-language daily Yemen Observer, Akram Sabra, managing editor of the weekly al-Hurriya, reporter Yehiya al-Abed of Hurriya, and Kamal al-Aalafi, editor-in-chief of Arabic weekly al-Rai al-Aam.  The Yemeni journalists' association called for the release of the journalists and for the annulment of the closure decrees "because these measures were not ordered by a court".  On 3 May the newspapers reopened, although some charges persist.

On 24 November 2006, Kamal al-Aalafi was sentenced to a year in prison.  The sentencing court also ordered that the paper be closed for six months and that al-Aalafi himself not be permitted to write for an equal amount of time.  He was subsequently released on bail.

On 4 December 2006, Mohammed al-Asaadi was ordered jailed until he could pay a fine of 500,000 rials (approximately $2500).

References

Jyllands-Posten Muhammad cartoons controversy
Lists of newspapers
Cartooning-related lists